Sungang railway station, formerly "Shenzhen North railway station," is a freight station in Luohu District of Shenzhen, Guangdong, China. The current station was opened in June 1973 and is on Guangshen railway and Jingjiu railway.

History
The original station was opened in 1962 with its name "Sungang", expanded in 1973 and changed to its "Shenzhen North" in 1977. Its name was changed back to "Sungang" again in 2008 due to the same name as another "Shenzhen North railway station" in the future Guangzhou–Shenzhen–Hong Kong Express Rail Link.

Facilities

Luohu District
Railway stations in China opened in 1973
Stations on the Beijing–Kowloon Railway
Stations on the Guangzhou–Shenzhen Railway